The 1892–93 Welsh Amateur Cup was the third season of the Welsh Amateur Cup. The cup was won by Wrexham Gymnasium who defeated Wrockwardine Wood 1–0 in the final.

First round

Second round

Third round

Semi-final

Final

References

1892-93
Welsh Cup
1892–93 domestic association football cups